The Sacrilicious Sounds of the Supersuckers is the third studio album by the American rock band Supersuckers. It was released on August 8, 1995, on Sub Pop.

The word sacrilicious is a portmanteau of sacrilegious and delicious. It was popularized in "Homer Loves Flanders", a 1994 episode of the television series The Simpsons.

Track listing
"Bad, Bad, Bad" – 2:20
"Born with a Tail" – 3:15
"The 19th Most Powerful Woman in Rock" – 2:53
"Doublewide" – 2:17
"Bad Dog" – 3:50
"Money into Sin" – 2:15
"Marie" – 3:26
"The Thing About That" – 2:19
"Ozzy" – 2:34
"Run Like a Motherfucker" (Rick Sims Vox) – 2:23
"Hittin' the Gravel" – 2:23
"Stoned If You Want It" – 2:11
"My Victim" – 3:55
"Don't Go Blue" – 4:20

Personnel
Supersuckers
Eddie Spaghetti – vocals, bass
Rick Sims – guitar, backing vocals
Dancing Eagle – drums
Dan Bolton – guitar
Production and additional personnel
Paul Leary – production

Notes
"Marie" documents the death of original lead singer Eric Martin of a drug overdose.
"Don't Go Blue" has Bobbie Nelson, sister of the country musician Willie Nelson, on piano.
The original print run of the CD had a lenticular cover. This gave it a 3D effect and allowed the album title to appear and disappear.
"Born With a Tail" was released as single and made into a music video.

References

Supersuckers albums
1995 albums
Sub Pop albums